The Nevada County Traction Company was an interurban electrified railway in Nevada County, part of the U.S. State of California in the United States of America.  It connected Grass Valley and Nevada City, a total of about six miles of track, using streetcar technology.  Construction was in 1901; founder and promoter John Martin intended to build a system connecting the area to Sacramento, the state capital, but this was never begun. Abandonment was in 1923.

References

Defunct California railroads
Defunct town tramway systems by city
Interurban railways in California
Railway lines opened in 1901
1901 establishments in California
Railway lines closed in 1923
1923 disestablishments in California